Cokelat are an Indonesian rock band, formed in Bandung, West Java, in 1996. They have released seven albums.

Career
The band was formed at the Sekolah Tinggi Seni Rupa & Desain Indonesia in Bandung in 1996. The band's name, Cokelat, order meant to they are liked by many people like chocolate. Their music originally was influenced by Frente, Alanis Morissette and The Cranberries.

In February 2000, they released the album Untuk Bintang with "Pergi" as the main track.

In 2001, the band released Rasa Baru with "Karma" as the first track.

In 2002, they released a repackaged version of Rasa Baru; the singles were "Bendera" and "Luka Lama".

In 2003, the band released the album Segitiga on an airplane in flight.

In 2004, they released the album Dari Hati with "Saat Jarak Memisahkan" as the main track.

In 2009, they released the single "Lima Menit untuk Lima Tahun" in order to socialize the 2009 Indonesian legislative election.

In March 2010, Kikan resigned, and in June 2010 the drummer Ervin resigned or was fired. Sarah replaced Kikan as the vocalist and the drummer position is filled by additional player.

In 2020, Cokelat announced Aiu Ratna (ex garasi band) is filling the lead singer duty.

See also

 List of alternative-rock artists
 List of Indonesian musicians and musical groups
 List of Sony BMG artists
 Music of Indonesia

References

https://www.kompas.com/hype/read/2020/11/30/144915366/alasan-cokelat-pilih-aiu-ratna-sebagai-vokalis

External links
 
 

1996 establishments in Indonesia
Musical groups established in 1996
Musical groups from Bandung
Indonesian alternative rock groups
Indonesian pop music groups
Sony BMG artists